The 2011–12 ISU Grand Prix of Figure Skating was a series of senior international figure skating competitions in the 2011–12 season. Skaters competed in the disciplines of men's singles, ladies singles, pair skating, and ice dancing at six invitational competitions in the fall of 2011. Skaters earned points based on their placement at each event and the skaters who finished in the top six in each discipline qualified to compete at the Grand Prix Final, held in Quebec City, Canada.

The Grand Prix series set the stage for the 2012 European, Four Continents, and World Championships, as well as each country's national championships. The Grand Prix series began on 21 October 2011 and ended on 11 December 2011.

The Grand Prix was organized by the International Skating Union. Skaters competed for prize money and for a chance to compete in the Grand Prix Final. The corresponding series for junior-level skaters was the 2011–12 ISU Junior Grand Prix.

Schedule

Changes 
The maximum number of entries at each event was reduced from twelve to ten in singles and from ten to eight in ice dancing. This reduced by twelve the number of available spots in each discipline. The number of spots for pairs had already been reduced to eight and remained at that level.

The number of possible events was increased to three for the top six in each discipline at the 2011 World Championships. This had been allowed in the early years of the Grand Prix series but reduced to two later. If all of the skaters accepted, it would reduce by six the number of available spots for other skaters, which combined with the reduction of entries, would result in 18 fewer spots available to other skaters in each discipline, compared to the previous season. The top six were offered a US$10,000 bonus to compete at three events but face a fine if they later withdraw, even for valid medical reasons. About 29% of the 24 skaters/teams opted for three events.

A minimum score requirement was introduced to the Grand Prix series for the first time.

General requirements
Skaters who reach the age of 14 by 1 July 2011 were eligible to compete on the senior Grand Prix circuit.

Minimum score requirements were added to the Grand Prix series and were set at three-fifths of the top scores at the 2011 World Championships. Prior to competing in a Grand Prix event, skaters were required to earn the following scores:

The International Skating Union decided that the minimums do not apply to "host picks", i.e. Canadians Adriana DeSanctis and Elladj Balde were allowed to compete at their home country's event, 2011 Skate Canada International, despite failing to reach the minimums at the 2011 Nebelhorn Trophy.

Assignments
The top six skaters/teams from the 2011 World Championships were seeded and assigned to two events. They also had the option of competing at a third event, receiving a US$10,000 bonus if they chose to do so, with their best two results counting toward qualifying for the Grand Prix Final. There were no substitutions of the seeded positions.

Skaters who placed 7–12 at 2011 Worlds were guaranteed two assignments. The remaining spots could be given to skaters who placed in the top 24 on the season's best score or world ranking lists. However, these skaters were not guaranteed any events, even if they had a higher Season's Best score than skaters in the top 12 at Worlds but did not compete at the event due to the three-per-country restriction.

The host country was allowed to assign three skaters/teams of their choosing from their country in each discipline.

Skaters who missed one or more seasons but had placed in the top six at any previous World Championships had the option of getting assignments to the Grand Prix under the "Come-back skaters" clause. They were obliged to commit to two events and could take advantage of this clause only once.

The following skaters have received assignments for one or more Grand Prix events:

Men

Ladies

Pairs

Ice dance

Replacements
A list of alternates was used to call up replacements, in the following order:
 Come-back skaters
 Skaters from split teams which had placed in the top 12 at a previous World Championships
 Skaters from the top 24 on the season's best (SB) list
 Skaters from the top 24 SB who have only one event
 All other skaters in the top 75 SB
 Winners of selected international competitions (Nebelhorn, Ondrej Nepela, Finlandia, Coupe de Nice, Ice Challenge, NRW Ice Dance Trophy)

Skaters from split teams which placed in the top 12 at the 2010 or 2011 World Championships and earned the minimum score in that period were not required to earn a new minimum with the new partner.

Medal summary

Top Grand Prix scores
Skaters ranked according to total score. The short and free columns break down the total score of a skater's best overall event into the short program and free skating.

Men
Top senior Grand Prix scores after six events: Skate America, Skate Canada International, Cup of China, NHK Trophy, Trophée Eric Bompard, Rostelecom Cup, and Grand Prix Final.

Ladies
Top senior Grand Prix scores after six events: Skate America, Skate Canada International, Cup of China, NHK Trophy, Trophée Eric Bompard, Rostelecom Cup, and Grand Prix Final.

Pairs
Top senior Grand Prix scores after six events: Skate America, Skate Canada International, Cup of China, NHK Trophy, Trophée Eric Bompard, Rostelecom Cup, and Grand Prix Final.

Ice dancing
Top senior Grand Prix scores after six events: Skate America, Skate Canada International, Cup of China, NHK Trophy, Trophée Eric Bompard, Rostelecom Cup, and Grand Prix Final.

Prize money and Grand Prix Final qualification points 
The top finishers earned prize money, as well as points toward qualifying for the Grand Prix Final, according to the chart below.

After the last event, the 2011 Cup of Russia, the six skaters/teams with the most points advanced to the Grand Prix Final. If a skater or team competed at three events, their two best results counted toward the standings. There were seven tie-breakers:
Highest placement at an event. If a skater placed 1st and 3rd, the tiebreaker was the 1st place, and that beats a skater who placed 2nd in both events.
Highest combined total scores in both events. If a skater earned 200 points at one event and 250 at a second, that skater would win in the second tie-break over a skater who earned 200 points at one event and 150 at another.
Participated in two events.
Highest combined scores in the free skating/free dancing portion of both events.
Highest individual score in the free skating/free dancing portion from one event.
Highest combined scores in the short program/original dance of both events.
Highest number of total participants at the events.

If a tie remained, it was considered unbreakable and the tied skaters all qualified for the Grand Prix Final.

Qualification standings
Bold denotes Grand Prix Final qualification.

Medal standings

References

External links 
Men standings, ISU, retrieved 30 October 2011
Ladies standings, ISU, retrieved 30 October 2011
Pairs standings, ISU, retrieved 30 October 2011
Ice dance standings, ISU, retrieved 30 October 2011

Isu Grand Prix of Figure Skating, 2011-12
ISU Grand Prix of Figure Skating